Podgorac may refer to:
 Podgorac (Boljevac), a small town in the municipality of Boljevac in the Zaječar District, Serbia
 Podgorac (Ražanj), a village in the municipality of Ražanj in the Nišava District, Serbia

See also
 Podgorač, a village and a municipality in Osijek-Baranja County, Croatia
 Podgorci (disambiguation)
 , a village in the municipality of Vitina, Kosovo-Pomoravlje District, Kosovo and Metohija, Serbia / a village in the municipality of Vitina, District of Gjilan, Kosovo
 Podgorica (disambiguation)